Cosmosoma auge is a moth of the family Erebidae. It was described by Carl Linnaeus in 1767. It is found in Mexico, Panama, Colombia, Suriname, Brazil (São Paulo) and Uruguay, as well as on St. Thomas, Jamaica, Cuba and Puerto Rico.

References

auge
Moths described in 1767
Taxa named by Carl Linnaeus